Hu Xiaotao (born June 30, 1981 in Jinzhou, Liaoning) is a female Chinese basketball player. She was part of the team that won the gold medal at the ABC Championship for Women 2001. She was also the MVP of the ABC Championship for Women 2001.

References
http://2004.sina.com.cn/star/hu_xiaotao/index.shtml (Chinese)

1981 births
Living people
Basketball players at the 2004 Summer Olympics
Olympic basketball players of China
People from Jinzhou
Basketball players from Liaoning
Chinese women's basketball players
Shenyang Army Golden Lions players